The plantar metatarsal veins run backward in the metatarsal spaces, collect blood from digital veins and communicate, by means of perforating veins, with the veins on the dorsum of the foot, and unite to form the deep plantar venous arch which lies alongside the plantar arterial arch.

References 

Veins of the lower limb